Eldridge Emory (born March 19, 1935) is an American politician who served in the South Carolina House of Representatives from the 45th district from 1998 to 2006.

References

1935 births
Living people
Democratic Party members of the South Carolina House of Representatives